Labour Party of Peru was a political party in Peru.  It was founded in 1925 by José Manuel Rodríguez.

Defunct political parties in Peru
Labour parties
Political parties established in 1925
Political parties with year of disestablishment missing
1925 establishments in Peru